This page lists public opinion polls conducted for the 2014 European Parliament election in France, which was held on 25 May 2014.

Unless otherwise noted, all polls listed below are compliant with the regulations of the national polling commission (Commission nationale des sondages) and utilize the quota method.

Graphical summary 
The averages in the graphs below were constructed using polls listed below conducted by the eight major French pollsters. The graphs are smoothed 14-day weighted moving averages, using only the most recent poll conducted by any given pollster within that range (each poll weighted based on recency).

National results for LO, NPA, ND, EC, AEI, NC, FV, and DLR lists were not provided by the Ministry of the Interior in the 2014 European elections. These lists, respectively, received 1.17%, 0.39%, 2.90%, 0.67%, 1.12%, 1.41%, 0.74%, and 3.82% of the vote in the 8, 5, 7, 6, 5, 7, 8, and 8 constituencies, respectively, in which they presented lists.

Voting intentions 
Starting on 10 April 2014, Ifop-Fiducial published a "rolling" poll for Paris Match which is listed in the tables below as "Ifop-Fiducial" without an asterisk, while separate polls not conducted as part of the "rolling" poll are listed with an asterisk (*).

Regionalist lists received 0.25% of the vote in 2009; this total is included in that for other lists, which would otherwise have been 4.45%.

By constituency

Est

Île-de-France

Sud-Est

See also 
Opinion polling for the 2019 European Parliament election in France
Opinion polling for the 2009 European Parliament election in France

References

External links 
Notices of the French polling commission 

Opinion polling in France
France